New York Life Insurance Company (NYLIC) is the third-largest life insurance company in the United States, the largest mutual life insurance company in the United States,  and is ranked #67 on the 2021 Fortune 500 list of the largest United States corporations by total revenue. NYLIC has about $593 billion in total assets under management, and more than $25 billion in surplus and AVR. In 2019, NYLIC achieved the best possible ratings by the four independent rating companies (Standard & Poor's, AM Best, Moody's and Fitch). Other New York Life affiliates provide an array of securities products and services, as well as institutional and retail mutual funds.

History

Early history

New York Life Insurance Company first opened in Manhattan's Financial District as Nautilus Mutual Life in 1841, 10 years after the first life insurance charter was granted in the United States. Originally chartered in 1841, the company also sold fire and marine insurance. The company's first president, James De Peyster Ogden, was appointed in 1845. Nautilus renamed itself New York Life Insurance Company in 1845 to concentrate on its life insurance business.

In its early years (1846–1848) the company, along with other insurance companies of the day including Aetna and US Life, insured the lives of slaves for their owners. By 1847 these accounted for onethird of New York Life's policies. The board of trustees voted to end the sale of insurance policies on slaves in 1848. The company also sold policies to soldiers and civilians involved in combat during the American Civil War and paid claims under a flag of truce during that time. In the late 1800s, the company began employing female agents.

New York Life continued to grow throughout its first 100 years as the national population and the market for life insurance increased. New York Life's growth was in part fueled by its introduction of a system by which the company used agents to find new business. In 1892, company President John A. McCall introduced the branch office system: offices that served as liaisons between New York and field agents.

In 1894, the company became the first US-based insurance provider to offer life insurance to women at the same cost as men; social reformer Susan B. Anthony was one of the company's first female policyholders. In 1896, New York Life became the first company to insure people with disabilities or in hazardous occupations.

20th century
The New York Life Building at 51 Madison Avenue in Manhattan, designed by American architect Cass Gilbert, opened in December 1928. The company moved into the 34-story skyscraper in 1929. Later that year, New York Life's assets survived the stock market crash; state regulation and company investing policy had led New York Life to invest in government bonds and real estate, not common stocks.

Following World War II, New York Life further diversified; it invested in real estate development in the late 1940s and launched a mortgage-loan program for veterans in 1946. In 1957, New York Life hired one of the industry's first black agents, Cirilo McSween. In the 1970s, New York Life began selling annuities and mutual funds. In the late 1990s and early 2000s, as other mutual life insurance companies became publicly traded corporations, New York Life remained a mutual company. New York Life entered the Mexican market in 1999 when it acquired Seguros Monterrey from Aetna.

Recent history
New York Life, along with other insurance companies, relaxed the claims process for missing persons in the wake of the September 11 attacks. Fearful of the stability of the market during the two years prior to the financial crisis of 2007–2008, New York Life moved its cash into other investments such as treasury bonds. In the ensuing financial crisis, New York Life Insurance Company rejected assistance from the U.S. Treasury Department.

Following the 2013 acquisition of Dexia Asset Management, later renamed Candriam Investors Group, New York Life Investments became one of the largest asset managers worldwide, with access to markets in Europe, Asia and Australia, in addition to the United States.

In November 2021, the company announced that company president Craig DeSanto was replacing CEO Ted Mathas. The transition was finalized in April 2022, and Mathas stayed with the company as a non-executive chairman.

Operations
As of 2016, New York Life Insurance Company was the country's third-largest life insurance company. A mutual insurance company, New York Life is owned by its policyholders and has no outside shareholders. As a mutual, New York Life distributes a portion of its earnings to eligible policyholders as annual dividends. As of 2016, the company has paid a dividend every year since 1854. Through Seguros Monterrey New York Life, the company offers insurance in Mexico.

New York Life's core product is whole life insurance, a type of life insurance offering lifelong protection that builds cash value over time. New York Life also sells term life insurance, universal life insurance, variable universal life insurance, long-term care insurance, annuities and disability insurance. The company operates New York Life Direct, selling direct-to-consumer policies, and is the exclusive life insurance partner of the AARP.

Asset management businesses
New York Life Investments is a subsidiary global asset management business which serves both institutional and retail clients. It ranks No. 26 by total worldwide institutional assets under management, according to Pensions & Investments''' Largest Money Managers Survey 2017.

The group manages money through independent investment boutiques. These boutiques include:
Ausbil, an Australian investment boutique specializing in equities
Candriam Investors Group, which focuses on high yield, absolute return, emerging debt, sustainable investments and asset allocation strategies
Credit Value Partners, which specializes in opportunistic, distressed debt and high-yield corporate credit
GoldPoint Partners, a private equity firm
IndexIQ, which specializes in exchange-traded funds and alternative investment strategies
MacKay Shields, an asset management firm that focuses on income generation and offers capital growth through mutual and hedge funds
Madison Capital Funding, which provides financing to private equity firms
Private Advisors, an asset manager specializing in hedge funds and private equity funds

Charitable efforts
New York Life Foundation is the insurance company's philanthropic arm. Its areas of focus include childhood bereavement. New York Life Foundation first became involved in childhood bereavement programs when it supported the Comfort Zone Camp in 2007. Its partners and programs include the National Alliance of Grieving Children, Grief Reach, Coalition to Support Grieving Students, Camp Erin/Moyer Foundation, Tragedy Assistance Program for Survivors and Boys and Girls Clubs of America. It sponsored the HBO documentary One Last Hug.

The company also emphasizes giving to various cultural communities, including the African-American community. The company also funded a $10 million endowment to the Colin Powell Center for Policy Studies at the City College of New York called the New York Life Endowment for Emerging African-American Issues in 2006.

Ratings and rankings
In June 2018, New York Life ranks No. 69 on the Fortune 500. In 2017  Fortune  named New York Life among its Most Admired Companies in the life insurance industry. Forbes'' ranked New York Life #364 among America's Best  Employers for 2017. As of 2019, New york Life ranks No. 71 on the Fortune 500.

By the end of 2019, New York Life had earned the highest financial strength ratings from major four rating agencies: A++ from A.M.Best, AAA from Fitch Ratings, Aaa from Moody and AA+ from Standard & Poor's.

References

External links
Official website

 
Insurance companies based in New York City
Mutual insurance companies of the United States
Financial services companies established in 1845
1845 establishments in New York (state)